The Marriage Act 1994 (c. 34) is an Act of the Parliament of the United Kingdom. Introduced as a private member's bill by Gyles Brandreth, it amended the Marriage Act 1949 to allow civil marriages to be solemnized in certain "approved premises". Prior to the Act, marriage ceremonies could only be conducted in churches and register offices. "Approved premises", for the purpose of the Act, include publicly available premises which are "readily identifiable" as marriage venues, support the "dignity of marriage", and do not have any official connections with any religion or religious institution. The majority of these approved premises are hotels, as well as stately homes, restaurants, and leisure clubs. The Act also allows couples to marry in registration districts in which neither member of the couple resides.

References

External links

United Kingdom Acts of Parliament 1994
Marriage law in the United Kingdom